Vladimir Vladimirovich Alyoshin (born March 9, 1945, Moscow) is a Soviet and Russian sports functionary and businessman.

From December 1982 before April 2011, the CEO of Luzhniki Olympic Complex. With his participation, the reconstruction of the sports complex for the 1980 Summer Olympics, the Big and Small sports arenas, the Palace of Sports, the Swimming pool and other objects are modernized.

Former Chairman of the Board of Directors of FC Torpedo Moscow. At various times he was a member of the Russian Olympic Committee, Executive Committee of the Russian Football Union, UEFA Stadium and Security Committee and Executive Committee of the European Association of Stadium Managers. In 2001, he was a recipient of the Silver Olympic Order.

References

External links
 Владимир Алёшин. Ведомости

1945 births
Businesspeople from Moscow
Recipients of the Olympic Order
Recipients of the Order "For Merit to the Fatherland", 3rd class
Recipients of the Order "For Merit to the Fatherland", 4th class
Recipients of the Order of the Red Banner of Labour
FC Torpedo Moscow
Russian football chairmen and investors
Living people